Janet Jennings Auchincloss Rutherfurd (June 13, 1945 – March 13, 1985) was an American socialite. She was the half sister of the former First Lady of the United States, Jacqueline Kennedy Onassis, and socialite Lee Radziwill.

Early life
Auchincloss was born in New York City, the daughter of stockbroker Hugh D., Jr. and socialite Janet Auchincloss (née Lee). She was named after her mother (and was referred to as "Janet, Jr" by friends and family) while her middle name was in honor of her paternal grandmother, Emma Jennings. She had a younger brother, James Lee (known as "Jamie", born in 1947). In addition to elder half-sisters Jacqueline and Caroline (known as "Lee"), from her mother's first marriage to stockbroker John "Black Jack" Bouvier III, she had three elder half-siblings from her father's previous marriages: Hugh III (known as "Yusha", 1927–2015), Nina, and Thomas "Tommy" Auchincloss (born 1937). In the winter of 1945, Auchincloss was christened at the St. John Episcopal Church in The Plains, Virginia, and was raised in the faith.

She was educated at the Potomac School in McLean, Virginia, and Miss Porter's School in Farmington, Connecticut, the alma mater of her half-sisters Jacqueline and Lee. She went on to study music history at Sarah Lawrence College before leaving in 1966 to marry. Before meeting her future husband, Auchincloss briefly dated future Secretary of State John Kerry.

On August 17, 1963, Auchincloss was formally presented to society at a ball held at Hammersmith Farm, her childhood home in Newport, Rhode Island.

Personal life
On July 30, 1966, she married Lewis Polk Rutherfurd, a recent graduate of Princeton University and future financier. Lewis was the son of Winthrop Rutherfurd, Jr. of New York and Fishers Island, the grandson of Frank L. Polk, the Under Secretary of State in Woodrow Wilson's cabinet, and the great-grandson of Levi P. Morton, the former governor of New York and vice president under Benjamin Harrison.
They had three children:

Lewis Stuyvesant Rutherfurd
Andrew Hugh Auchincloss Rutherfurd
Alexandra Rutherfurd

Later years and death
In 1966, the Rutherfurds moved to Hong Kong where Auchincloss Rutherfurd taught French at Chinese University of Hong Kong for two years. She also served as an adviser and stockholder for the venture capital firm her husband co-founded and managed, Inter-Asia Venture Management. She later founded an overseas chapter of the League of Women Voters.

In August 1984, Auchincloss Rutherfurd was diagnosed with lung cancer.
Despite undergoing aggressive treatments, the cancer spread to her brain and pancreas. On March 13, 1985, she died at Dana–Farber Cancer Institute in Boston at the age of 39. Her private funeral was held on March 19 at the Trinity Church in Newport, Rhode Island, after which she was buried at Common Burying Ground and Island Cemetery.

Footnotes

Works cited
 
 

1945 births
1985 deaths
20th-century American Episcopalians
American expatriates in Hong Kong
American socialites
Auchincloss family
Burials at Common Burying Ground and Island Cemetery
Deaths from lung cancer in Massachusetts
Miss Porter's School alumni
People from Newport, Rhode Island
People from New York City
Rutherfurd family
Sarah Lawrence College alumni